Peter Haddon (31 March 1898 – 7 September 1962) was an English actor.

Personal life

Haddon was born Peter Haddon Tildsley in Rawtenstall, Lancashire. He was the son of Alfred and Mary Tildsley and he had a brother, Vincent Harvey (1894), and two sisters, Edna and Mary. His father was a clergyman.

In 1925, he married Rosaline Jane Courtneidge (1903–1926), a daughter of Robert Courtneidge and her eldest sister was Cicely Courtneidge. Peter and Rosaline Tildsley had a daughter, Rosaline (1926–2011). In 1932 as a widower, he married divorcée Edith Ralston Hicks Lyon, née Huxtable.  By 1945 she had married another husband.

Career

He first became associated with the theatre as a member of the Footlights Dramatic Society while reading medicine at Caius College, Cambridge. His first professional appearance was at the Adelphi Theatre, London in 1920, and went on to appear at almost every London theatre. Among his stage credits for the 1920s are Charlot's Revue (1925) and (1927) (with Beatrice Lillie and Gertrude Lawrence), and Good Morning, Bill (1928), in which his understudy was William Hartnell and, for the 1930s his credits included Paulette, Tell Her the Truth (with Bobby Howes and Alfred Drayton), That's a Pretty Thing, Who's Who, Anything Goes (Palace Theatre, London, 1935), Love and Let Love (with Claire Luce), No Sleep for the Wicked and Under Your Hat (with Jack Hulbert and Cicely Courtneidge). In 1935 he became the first actor to portray Dorothy L. Sayers' fictional detective Lord Peter Wimsey on-screen. In 1947, he co-starred with Robertson Hare in the West End comedy, She Wanted a Cream Front Door and appeared in Lord Arthur Savile's Crime at the Court Theatre in 1952. He entered films in the middle 1920s and wrote several plays. In the 1940s and 1950s, he made numerous theatrical tours in the provinces. In 1953, he formed his own company, assumed the management of the Hippodrome in Aldershot, and presented weekly repertory. In 1955, he transferred his company to Wimbledon and continued as actor-manager of the Wimbledon Theatre until his death in 1962.

Filmography
The Second Mrs. Tanqueray (1952) – Sir George Orreyed
Moulin Rouge (1952) (uncredited)
Helter Skelter (1949) – Major Basil Beagle
Over the Moon (1939) – Lord Petcliffe
Good Morning, Bill (1939) (TV) – Bill
Kate Plus Ten (1938) – Boltover
The House of the Spaniard (1936) – David Grey
The Beloved Vagabond (1936) – Major Walters
Mother, Don't Rush Me (1936) – Adolphe
Public Nuisance No. 1 (1936/I) – Richard Trelawny
The Secret of Stamboul (1936) – Peter
No Monkey Business (1935) – Arthur
The Silent Passenger (1935) – Lord Peter Wimsey
Who's Your Father (1935) – Frank Steadley
Death at Broadcasting House (1934) – Guy Bannister
Alf's Button (1930) – Lieutenant Allen
Greek Street (1930) – Businessman
Oxford Bags (1926) – The Golfer
The Clicking of Cuthbert (1924) – Cuthbert
Lizzie's Last Lap (1924) – Fibs-Gerald

Early TV

References

External links

The Complete Index To World Film since 1895 – Peter Haddon filmography

English male actors
1898 births
1962 deaths
People from Rawtenstall
20th-century English male actors